The Saint Vincent blacksnake (Chironius vincenti), also commonly known as the Saint Vincent coachwhip, the San Vincent racer, and Vincent's sipo, is a species of snake in the family Colubridae.

Geographic range
C. vincenti is endemic to Saint Vincent, an island in the Caribbean Lesser Antilles that is part of Saint Vincent and the Grenadines.

Etymology
The specific name, vincenti, refers to the island of Saint Vincent.

Description
C. vincenti can grow to lengths in excess of a meter (40 inches). It is slate black, with a paler mouth and ventral surface.

Habitat

References

Further reading

Boulenger GA (1891). "On Reptiles, Batrachians, and Fishes from the Lesser West Indies". Proceedings of the Zoological Society of London 1891: 351–357. (Herpetodryas carinatus var. vincenti, new variation, p. 355).

External links
.
Chironius vincenti at the Encyclopedia of Life.
Chironius vincenti at the Reptile Database.

Chironius
Snakes of the Caribbean
Fauna of Saint Vincent and the Grenadines
Endemic fauna of Saint Vincent and the Grenadines
Reptiles described in 1891
Taxonomy articles created by Polbot